Villanueva (also called Timiriguaco) is a town and municipality located in the Bolívar Department, northern Colombia.

A restoration of name of the municipality to Timiriguaco was pending in 2008.

References

Municipalities of Bolívar Department